Davronjon Sodirovich Ergashev ((), born 19 March 1988) is a Tajikistani professional footballer who plays as a centre-back most recently played for Uzbekistan club FC Bunyodkor and the Tajik national team.

Career

Club

Istiqlol
He previously played for Regar-TadAZ Tursunzoda and Istiqlol.
After his contract with Istiqlol Dushanbe expired, in February 2013 he was on trial in Irtysh Pavlodar.

Zhetysu
Ergashev signed for FC Zhetysu prior to the start of the 2013 season, making his debut on 9 March 2013 against FC Kairat.

Gabala
In January 2014, Ergashev went on trial with Azerbaijan Premier League side Gabala, signing a six-month contract with Gabala on 25 January 2014.

Zhetysu Return
Following the expiration of his Gabala contract, Ergashev re-signed for FC Zhetysu.

Taraz
In June 2016, Ergashev left FC Istiklol, returning to the Kazakhstan Premier League by signing for FC Taraz. In January 2017, Ergashev extended his contract for an additional year, seeing him play for Taraz until the end of the 2017 season.

Khujand
On 29 January 2019, Ergashev signed for FK Khujand, returning to the club after 10-years away.

Bunyodkor
On 8 January 2020, Bunyodkor announced the signing of Ergashev.

International
He played for Tajikistan in 2008 AFC Challenge Cup, 2010 AFC Challenge Cup, 2012 AFC Challenge Cup.

Career statistics

Club

International

International goals
Scores and results list Tajikistan's goal tally first.

Honours
Khujand
Tajikistan Cup (1): 2008

Istiklol
Tajik League (3): 2011, 2016, 2018
Tajikistan Cup (2): 2016, 2018
AFC President's Cup (1): 2012
Tajik Supercup (1): 2016

References

External links

1988 births
Living people
Tajikistani footballers
Tajikistani expatriate footballers
Association football defenders
Tajikistan international footballers
Expatriate footballers in Kazakhstan
Expatriate footballers in Azerbaijan
Place of birth missing (living people)
FK Khujand players
Regar-TadAZ Tursunzoda players
Gabala FC players
Azerbaijan Premier League players
FC Irtysh Pavlodar players
FC Zhetysu players
Kazakhstan Premier League players
FC Istiklol players
FC Taraz players
Tajikistan Higher League players
FC Bunyodkor players
Uzbekistan Super League players